On May 19, 1992, both Presidential elections and 1992 Kurdistan Region parliamentary election were held. During the first round Presidential elections Kurdistan Democratic Party leader Massoud Barzani won slightly more votes than his main rival Jalal Talabani, the leader of the Patriotic Union of Kurdistan, however neither won a majority of votes, which was required to become President. Due to both leaders fearing they might lose in a run-off, the second round was never held and the Kurdistan Regional Government decided to move on without a President. Instead they established an 8-man Presidency Council consisting of four members of each party.

Meanwhile, they agreed on a power sharing agreement in the Kurdistan Parliament and Council of Ministers. This power-sharing agreement broke down in 1994 and resulted in a civil war that lasted until 1998, after which Kurdistan Region was divided into a PUK-controlled zone in the southeast and a KDP-controlled zone in the northwest.

References

1992 elections in Iraq
1992